Stigmella azaroli is a moth of the family Nepticulidae. It is found in Greece and on Cyprus.

The larvae feed on Crataegus azarolus. They mine the leaves of their host plant. The mine begins as a small corridor, entirely filled with frass. Later it widens, resembling a blotch.

External links
bladmineerders.nl
Fauna Europaea

Nepticulidae
Moths of Europe
Moths described in 1978